Pellucens is a genus of moths in the subfamily Lymantriinae. The genus was erected by George Thomas Bethune-Baker in 1910.

Species
Pellucens borneensis (Strand, 1915)
Pellucens kinabaluensis (Strand, 1915)
Pellucens lactea Bethune-Baker, 1910 New Guinea
Pellucens manifesta (Collenette, 1933) New Guinea
Pellucens subdenudata (Rothschild, 1915) New Guinea
Pellucens zeugosticta Collenette, 1938 Palawan, the Philippines

References

Lymantriinae